is a former Japanese football player. He played for Japan national team.

Club career
Yoshikawa was born in Mie Prefecture on December 13, 1961. After graduating from high school, he joined Hitachi in 1980. In 1992, he moved to Kyoto Shiko (later Kyoto Purple Sanga). In 1995, he moved to Kyoiku Kenkyusya (later FC Kyoken). He retired in 2000.

National team career
On February 12, 1983, Yoshikawa debuted for Japan national team against Syria.

National team statistics

References

External links

Japan National Football Team Database

1961 births
Living people
Association football people from Mie Prefecture
Japanese footballers
Japan international footballers
Japan Soccer League players
Japan Football League (1992–1998) players
Kashiwa Reysol players
Kyoto Sanga FC players
Ococias Kyoto AC players
Association football midfielders